Yimbun is a rural locality in the Somerset Region, Queensland, Australia. In the  Yimbun had a population of 33 people.

Geography
Yimbun is predominantly used for farming with no urban development. The Brisbane Valley Highway runs north to south through the locality. The now-closed Brisbane Valley railway line ran from north to south through Yimbun.

History
Yimbun takes its name from the Yimbun railway station, a word from the Dunibara dialect of the Waka language meaning bullrush (Typha angustifolia). It was briefly named Moorabool from 1904 to 1906 and then Kannangur from 1906 to 1914.

In the  Yimbun had a population of 33 people.

References

Further reading 

 

Suburbs of Somerset Region
Localities in Queensland